Caroline is an unincorporated community in Venice Township, Seneca County, Ohio, United States. It is located along State Route 4, just south of Attica. The community is served by the Attica (44807) post office.

History
Caroline was laid out in 1826. The community was named after Caroline, the daughter of a pioneer settler. A post office was established at Caroline in 1827, and discontinued in 1830.

References

Unincorporated communities in Ohio
Unincorporated communities in Seneca County, Ohio